Dérbi campineiro is the name given to the confrontations between very classic Guarani Futebol Clube x Associação Atlética Ponte Preta of the city of Campinas, in the State of São Paulo, what takes place from 1911, being able to affirm, is the biggest classic of the interior of Brazil, when the rich history of these 2 clubs and of the classic himself was given in individual, whose balance is the principal characteristic.

  

The room dérbi, on 28 August 1914, one friendly one carried out in the field of the Sousas, brought the certainty of what classic East a lot of significant would have a rivalry, since after the victory of the Guarani for 2 to 0, a fight of great proportions took the streets of then peaceful city of Campinas.

The first derby of the history, disputed on 24 March 1912, ended with the unknown result of the match.

On 26 September 1948, in the first derby of the current Stadium Moisés Lucarelli of the Ponte Preta, the Guarani won for 1–0.

On 7 June 1953, in the first dérbi of the Stadium Brinco de Ouro, of the Guarani, the Ponte Preta won for 3–0.

LAST MATCH 

GUARANI 3-0 PONTE PRETA

Brinco de Ouro da Princesa Stadium - Campinas, Brazil

Campeonato Paulista: Round 8

Date: 19 February 2022.

Statistics 

 201 matches
 537 goals
 69 wins of the Guarani
 66 wins of the Ponte Preta
 66 draws
 270 goals of the Guarani
 267 goals of the Ponte Preta
 Big thrashed of the Guarani in the Brinco de Ouro: 6–0 on 5 May 1960.
 Big thrashed of the Ponte Preta in the Brinco de Ouro: 4–0 on 22 August 1948.
 Big thrashed of the Guarani in the Moisés Lucarelli: 4–0 on 6 July 1952.
 Big thrashed of the Ponte Preta in the Moisés Lucarelli: 5–2 on 29 March 1953.
 Bigger invincibility of the Guarani: 14 matches (6 wins and 8 draws) between 28 June 1987 and 28 October 2002.
 Bigger invincibility of Ponte Preta: 16 matches (8 wins and 8 draws) between 27 June 1979 and 2 September 1984.
Bigger invencibilities: In nº of plays:
Ponte Preta; 16 matches. Guarani; 14 matches.

Titles comparison

Matches between Guarani x Ponte Preta in the Campeonato Paulista

 Matches: 82
 Wins of the Guarani: 22
 Wins of the Ponte Preta: 27
 Draws: 33
 Goals of the Guarani: 96
 Goals of the Ponte Preta: 107
 Ponte Preta 1 × 2 Guarani, 12 August 1951 (Moisés Lucarelli Stadium)
 Ponte Preta 2 × 2 Guarani, 2 December 1951 (Moisés Lucarelli Stadium)
 Ponte Preta 3 × 4 Guarani, 5 October 1952 (Moisés Lucarelli Stadium)
 Guarani 2 × 2 Ponte Preta, 25 January 1953 (Guanabara Stadium)
 Guarani 0 × 0 Ponte Preta, 13 September 1953 (Brinco de Ouro da Princesa Stadium)
 Ponte Preta 0 × 1 Guarani, 31 January 1954 (Moisés Lucarelli Stadium)
 Guarani 0 × 4 Ponte Preta, 22 August 1954 (Brinco de Ouro da Princesa Stadium)
 Ponte Preta 1 × 0 Guarani, 13 February 1955 (Moisés Lucarelli Stadium)
 Guarani 5 × 1 Ponte Preta, 28 August 1955 (Brinco de Ouro da Princesa Stadium)
 Ponte Preta 2 × 0 Guarani, 11 December 1955 (Moisés Lucarelli Stadium)
 Guarani 1 × 4 Ponte Preta, 10 August 1958 (Brinco de Ouro da Princesa Stadium)
 Ponte Preta 2 × 2 Guarani, 7 December 1958 (Moisés Lucarelli Stadium)
 Guarani 0 × 0 Ponte Preta, 31 May 1959 (Brinco de Ouro da Princesa Stadium)
 Ponte Preta 1 × 2 Guarani, 25 October 1959 (Moisés Lucarelli Stadium)
 Ponte Preta 3 × 2 Guarani, 21 August 1960 (Moisés Lucarelli Stadium)
 Guarani 3 × 0 Ponte Preta, 25 September 1960 (Brinco de Ouro da Princesa Stadium)
 Ponte Preta 1 × 0 Guarani, 12 July 1970 (Moisés Lucarelli Stadium)
 Guarani 2 × 2 Ponte Preta, 19 August 1970 (Brinco de Ouro da Princesa Stadium)
 Ponte Preta 1 × 0 Guarani, 28 March 1971 (Moisés Lucarelli Stadium)
 Ponte Preta 1 × 0 Guarani, 20 June 1971 (Moisés Lucarelli Stadium)
 Ponte Preta 0 × 0 Guarani, 5 March 1972 (Moisés Lucarelli Stadium)
 Ponte Preta 0 × 0 Guarani, 16 July 1972 (Moisés Lucarelli Stadium)
 Guarani 2 × 0 Ponte Preta, 13 May 1973 (Brinco de Ouro da Princesa Stadium)
 Guarani 0 × 0 Ponte Preta, 29 July 1973 (Brinco de Ouro da Princesa Stadium)
 Guarani 0 × 0 Ponte Preta, 18 August 1974 (Brinco de Ouro da Princesa Stadium)
 Ponte Preta 0 × 1 Guarani, 27 October 1974 (Moisés Lucarelli Stadium)
 Ponte Preta 0 × 1 Guarani, 23 March 1975 (Moisés Lucarelli Stadium)
 Ponte Preta 2 × 1 Guarani, 7 March 1976 (Moisés Lucarelli Stadium)
 Guarani 0 × 0 Ponte Preta, 22 August 1976 (Brinco de Ouro da Princesa Stadium)
 Ponte Preta 3 × 1 Guarani, 27 February 1977 (Moisés Lucarelli Stadium)
 Guarani 0 × 0 Ponte Preta, 7 August 1977 (Brinco de Ouro da Princesa Stadium)
 Ponte Preta 2 × 0 Guarani, 4 September 1977 (Moisés Lucarelli Stadium)
 Ponte Preta 0 × 0 Guarani, 5 November 1978 (Moisés Lucarelli Stadium)
 Guarani 1 × 1 Ponte Preta, 3 December 1978 (Brinco de Ouro da Princesa Stadium)
 Guarani 2 × 0 Ponte Preta, 3 June 1979 (Pacaembu Stadium - Sao Paulo)
 Ponte Preta 1 × 1 Guarani, 27 June 1979 (Moisés Lucarelli Stadium)
 Ponte Preta 1 × 0 Guarani, 19 August 1979 (Moisés Lucarelli Stadium)
 Guarani 1 × 1 Ponte Preta, 21 October 1979 (Brinco de Ouro da Princesa Stadium)
 Ponte Preta 2 × 1 Guarani, 27 January 1980 (Moisés Lucarelli Stadium)
 Guarani 0 × 1 Ponte Preta, 30 January 1980 (Brinco de Ouro da Princesa Stadium)
 Ponte Preta 3 × 0 Guarani, 20 July 1980 (Moisés Lucarelli Stadium)
 Guarani 0 × 0 Ponte Preta, 5 October 1980 (Brinco de Ouro da Princesa Stadium)
 Ponte Preta 0 × 0 Guarani, 5 July 1981 (Moisés Lucarelli Stadium)
 Guarani 1 × 1 Ponte Preta, 1 August 1981 (Brinco de Ouro da Princesa Stadium)
 Ponte Preta 3 × 2 Guarani, 5 August 1981 (Moisés Lucarelli Stadium)
 Guarani 0 × 0 Ponte Preta, 27 September 1981 (Brinco de Ouro da Princesa Stadium)
 Guarani 1 × 1 Ponte Preta, 12 September 1982 (Brinco de Ouro da Princesa Stadium)
 Ponte Preta 0 × 0 Guarani, 23 November 1982 (Moisés Lucarelli Stadium)
 Ponte Preta 1 × 0 Guarani, 10 July 1983 (Moisés Lucarelli Stadium)
 Guarani 0 × 1 Ponte Preta, 23 October 1983 (Brinco de Ouro da Princesa Stadium)
 Ponte Preta 2 × 1 Guarani, 2 September 1984 (Moisés Lucarelli Stadium)
 Guarani 3 × 1 Ponte Preta, 4 November 1984 (Brinco de Ouro da Princesa Stadium)
 Ponte Preta 3 × 0 Guarani, 9 June 1985 (Moisés Lucarelli Stadium)
 Guarani 2 × 1 Ponte Preta, 8 September 1985 (Brinco de Ouro da Princesa Stadium)
 Ponte Preta 1 × 1 Guarani, 20 April 1986 (Moisés Lucarelli Stadium)
 Guarani 1 × 1 Ponte Preta, 20 July 1986 (Brinco de Ouro da Princesa Stadium)
 Guarani 0 × 2 Ponte Preta, 3 May 1987 (Brinco de Ouro da Princesa Stadium)
 Ponte Preta 0 × 2 Guarani, 28 June 1987 (Moisés Lucarelli Stadium)
 Guarani 0 × 0 Ponte Preta, 18 March 1990 (Brinco de Ouro da Princesa Stadium)
 Ponte Preta 1 × 2 Guarani, 24 January 1993 (Moisés Lucarelli Stadium)
 Guarani 1 × 0 Ponte Preta, 21 March 1993 (Brinco de Ouro da Princesa Stadium)
 Ponte Preta 1 × 1 Guarani, 5 March 1994 (Moisés Lucarelli Stadium)
 Guarani 2 × 2 Ponte Preta, 8 May 1994 (Brinco de Ouro da Princesa Stadium)
 Ponte Preta 2 × 2 Guarani, 2 April 1995 (Moisés Lucarelli Stadium)
 Guarani 2 × 2 Ponte Preta, 7 May 1995 (Brinco de Ouro da Princesa Stadium)
 Guarani 2 × 1 Ponte Preta, 4 February 2001 (Brinco de Ouro da Princesa Stadium)
 Ponte Preta 1 × 3 Guarani, 23 February 2003 (Moisés Lucarelli Stadium)
 Guarani 2 × 2 Ponte Preta, 29 January 2005 (Brinco de Ouro da Princesa Stadium)
 Ponte Preta 2 × 2 Guarani, 5 February 2006 (Moisés Lucarelli Stadium)
 Ponte Preta 4 × 2 Guarani, 16 March 2008 (Moisés Lucarelli Stadium)
 Guarani 2 × 2 Ponte Preta, 8 February 2009 (Brinco de Ouro da Princesa Stadium)
 Ponte Preta 1 × 1 Guarani, 24 March 2012 (Moisés Lucarelli Stadium)
 Guarani 3 × 1 Ponte Preta, 29 April 2012 (Brinco de Ouro da Princesa Stadium)
 Guarani 1 × 3 Ponte Preta, 26 January 2013 (Brinco de Ouro da Princesa Stadium)
 Ponte Preta 3 × 0 Guarani, 16 March 2019 (Moisés Lucarelli Stadium)
 Guarani 3 × 2 Ponte Preta, 16 March 2020 (Brinco de Ouro da Princesa Stadium)
 Ponte Preta 3 × 1 Guarani, 5 May 2021 (Moisés Lucarelli Stadium)
 Guarani 3 × 0 Ponte Preta, 19 February 2022 (Brinco de Ouro da Princesa Stadium)

Matches between Guarani x Ponte Preta in the Campeonato Brasileiro of the 1st division

 Matches: 14
 Wins of the Guarani: 4
 Wins of the Ponte Preta: 4
 Draws: 6
 Goals of the Guarani: 14
 Goals of the Ponte Preta: 14

Public
Guarani 0-0 Ponte Preta, 3 October 1976, public: 14.285 (Brinco de Ouro).
Guarani 0-1 Ponte Preta, 20 November 1977, public: 22.309 (Brinco de Ouro).
Guarani 2-1 Ponte Preta, 23 April 1978, public: 21.397 (Brinco de Ouro).
Guarani 1-1 Ponte Preta, 10 July 1985, public: 15.505 (Brinco de Ouro).
Guarani 0-0 Ponte Preta, 17 July 1985, public: 13.904 (Moisés Lucarelli).
Guarani 2-0 Ponte Preta, 26 July 1998, public: 22.139 (Brinco de Ouro).
Guarani 0-0 Ponte Preta, 18 August 1999, public: 22.609 (Moisés Lucarelli).
Guarani 2-1 Ponte Preta, 2 November 2000, public: 21.539 (Brinco de Ouro).
Guarani 1-1 Ponte Preta, 21 October 2001, public: 17.125 (Moisés Lucarelli).
Guarani 2-4 Ponte Preta, 28 October 2002, public: 16.384 (Brinco de Ouro).
Guarani 2-0 Ponte Preta, 14 June 2003, public: 8.918 (Moisés Lucarelli).
Guarani 1-3 Ponte Preta, 11 October 2003, public: 8.795 (Brinco de Ouro).
Guarani 1-3 Ponte Preta, 10 July 2004, public: 6.819 (Moisés Lucarelli).
Guarani 0-0 Ponte Preta, 24 October 2004, public: 10.094 (Brinco de Ouro).

About Ponte Preta 

 Name: Associação Atlética Ponte Preta
 Foundation: 11 August 1900
 City: Campinas
 Nickname: "Macaca", "Nega Veia", "Veterana Campineira"
 Mascot: Macaca (She-monkey)
 Stadium: Moisés Lucarelli
 Capacity: 19.722
 Titles: 6 Campeonatos Paulistas do Interior and 3 Campeonato Paulista Série A2.
 Idols: Dicá, Carlos, Oscar, Polozzi, Juninho, Washington, Waldir Peres and Luís Fabiano.
 Season 2022: Campeonato Brasileiro Série B and Campeonato Paulista.

About Guarani 

 Name: Guarani Futebol Clube
 Foundation: 2 April 1911
 City: Campinas
 Nickname: "Bugre"
 Mascot: Índio (Indian)
 Stadium: Brinco de Ouro
 Capacity: 29,130
 Titles: 1 Campeonato Brasileiro, 1 Campeonato Brasileiro Série B, 5 Campeonatos Paulistas do Interior and 4 Campeonato Paulista Série A2.
 Idols: Amoroso, Luizão, Zenon, João Paulo, Evair and Fumagalli.
 Season 2022: Campeonato Brasileiro Série B and Campeonato Paulista.

See also 
 Clássico Majestoso
 Paulista Derby

Sources 
Website Guarani
Website Ponte Preta
Futpédia Globo: Ponte Preta x Guarani - History of battles in the Campeonato Paulista 

Brazilian football derbies
Associação Atlética Ponte Preta
Guarani FC